The 2013–14 Championnat de France amateur was the 16th season since its establishment. FC Chambly-Thelle, SAS Épinal, Marseille Consolat and US Avranches were promoted.

Teams
There were eight teams promoted from Championnat de France amateur 2, while eighteen teams were relegated from the 2012–13 Championnat de France amateur. These teams were also joined by SAS Épinal, AS Cherbourg and US Quevilly from the 2012–13 Championnat National. The original plan was to have FC Bourg-Péronnas, ES Uzès Pont du Gard and Paris FC also relegated from the Championnat National, but due DNCG rulings, FC Rouen, Le Mans FC and CS Sedan-Ardennes were relegated to lower divisions, and Bourg-Péronnas, Uzès Pont du Gard and Paris FC stayed on Championnat National.

On August 6, 2013, FCA Calvi, which ended on 7th on Group A, announced that they would renounce to participate the CFA because their stadium couldn't be homologated, which would force them to play in another stadium and that would be dangerous to their finances.

Because of the four spots open, FC Montceau Bourgogne, ES Viry-Châtillon, Stade Montois and Monts d'Or Azergues Foot remained on the CFA.

League tables

Group A

Group B

Group C

Group D

References

External links 
 Official site
 Standings and statistics 

 

2013-14
4
Fra